The 2011 Grote Prijs Jef Scherens was the 45th edition of the Grote Prijs Jef Scherens cycle race and was held on 4 September 2011. The race started and finished in Leuven. The race was won by Jérôme Pineau.

General classification

References

2011
2011 in road cycling
2011 in Belgian sport